In mathematics, a congruent transformation (or congruence transformation) is:
 Another term for an isometry; see congruence (geometry).
 A transformation of the form A → PTAP, where A and P are square matrices, P is invertible, and PT denotes the transpose of P; see Matrix Congruence and congruence in linear algebra.

Mathematics disambiguation pages